Battle of Częstochowa can refer to:
 Siege of Jasna Góra (1655)
 Bitwa pod Częstochową (1655)
 Bitwa pod Częstochową (1939)